The Last Mark is a Canadian thriller film, directed by Reem Morsi and released in 2022. The film stars Shawn Doyle as Keele, a hitman who is on his final assignment before retiring; after he and his partner Palmer's  (Bryce Hodgson) successful killing of the target is witnessed by sex worker Peyton (Alexia Fast), Keele abducts her with the intention of helping her escape the country for her safety before Palmer can find and kill her.

The cast also includes Jonas Chernick as Eli, a fixer Keefe enlists for help in shepherding Peyton to safety, as well as Jasmin Geljo, Josh Cruddas, Diane Johnstone and Andre Richards in supporting roles.

The film was screened for distributors in the Industry Selects program of the 2021 Toronto International Film Festival, but was not made available to the general public. It premiered on video on demand platforms in the United States on March 1, 2022, although its release in Canada was delayed until April so that the film could screen as part of the Canadian Film Festival on April 1.

Cast 

 Shawn Doyle as James Keele
 Alexia Fast as Peyton Sallow 
 Bryce Hodgson as Palmer
 Jonas Chernick as Eli
 Diane Johnstone as Mike's Mom
 Jasmin Geljo as Oslo
 Josh Cruddas as Doug

References

External links

2022 films
Canadian thriller films
English-language Canadian films
2022 thriller films
2020s English-language films
2020s Canadian films